Andrejs Kapmals  (5 November 1889 – 21 January 1994) was a Latvian athlete who competed for Russia at the 1912 Summer Olympics in Stockholm, where he was one of numerous participants who failed to complete the men's marathon. He was born in Riga and competed out of Rīgas Marss.

References

1889 births
1994 deaths
Latvian centenarians
Olympic competitors for the Russian Empire
Athletes (track and field) at the 1912 Summer Olympics
Latvian male marathon runners
Athletes from Riga
Men centenarians